The 2019 Albany Empire season was the second season for the Albany Empire in the Arena Football League. The Empire played at the Times Union Center and were coached by Rob Keefe for the 2019 season.

In just their second season of existence, the Empire finished with the best regular season record and advanced to ArenaBowl XXXII, where they defeated the Philadelphia Soul to win their first league championship.

Standings

Schedule

Regular season
The 2019 regular season schedule was released on February 13, 2019. All times Eastern.

Postseason

Game summaries

Roster

References

Albany Empire
Albany Empire (AFL) seasons
21st century in New York (state)
2019 in sports in New York (state)
ArenaBowl champion seasons